2,2′-Biphenylene phosphorochloridite is the name for a polycyclic organophosphorus compound with the formula C12H8O2PCl.  It is a precursor to diphosphite ligands such as BiPhePhos by reaction with suitable diols.  2,2′-Biphenylene phosphorochloridites, which is a white solid, is prepared from 2,2′-biphenol and phosphorus trichloride. It is prepared by the reaction of 2,2′-biphenol and phosphorus trichloride.

References

 
Phosphorus halides
Phosphorus(III) compounds